Tapani is a male given name common in Finland equivalent the name of Stephen.  As of 2013 there were more than 150,000 people with this name in Finland. A variant of Tapani is Tahvo. The name Teppo is a diminutive of Tapani. It is listed by the Finnish Population Register Centre as one of the top 10 most popular male given names ever.

Notable people
Some people who have this name include:

 Tapani Aartomaa, Finnish graphic designer
 Tapani Haapakoski, Finnish pole vaulter
 Tapani Kalliomäki, Finnish actor
 Tapani Kansa, Finnish singer
 Tapani Niku, Finnish cross-country skier 
 Tapani Rinne, Finnish musician
 Tapani Talo, Finnish-American architect and sound technician
 Tapani Tölli, Finnish politician
 Tapani Uitos, Finnish darts player
 Tapani Kalmaru, Welsh archer

References 

Finnish masculine given names